Azya orbigera, the globe-marked lady beetle, is a species of lady beetle in the family Coccinellidae. It is found in North America, Oceania, and South America.

Subspecies
These two subspecies belong to the species Azya orbigera:
 Azya orbigera ecuadorica Gordon
 Azya orbigera orbigera Mulsant, 1850

References

Further reading

 

Coccinellidae
Articles created by Qbugbot
Beetles described in 1850